SASO may refer to:

 South African Students' Organisation
 Michael Saso (born 1930), American academic
 Société Aéronautique du Sud-Ouest, French aircraft company that was merged into Société nationale des constructions aéronautiques du sud-ouest in 1938
 Stability And Support Operations
 Saudi Standards, Metrology and Quality Organization (SASO)
 Senior Air Staff Officer

See also
Sasso